Colfax Junior-Senior High School is a comprehensive community middle school and public high school in the city of Colfax, Washington.

It is the only public Junior-Senior high school in the city and in the Colfax School District (#300).

Athletics 
Colfax Junior-Senior High School offers different sports for students to participate in.

During Fall, the school offers HS Cross Country, HS Football, HS Volleyball, JH Cross Country, JH Football, and JH Girls Basketball.

During Winter, the school offers HS B-G Basketball, JH Girls Volleyball, HS Wrestling, JH Wrestling, and JH Boys Basketball.

During Spring, the school offers HS Boys Baseball, HS Golf, HS Girls Softball, HS Track, and JH Track.

School Mascot
Colfax Junior-Senior High School's mascot is the Bulldog.

Extracurricular/Activities 
Colfax Junior-Senior High School offers a great deal of extracurricular activity including: 
Knowledge Bowl, Future Problem Solvers, Honor Society, Cheerleading, Choir / Musical, Jazz / Concert Band, CHS League, Technology Club, FCCLA, Yearbook, SADD, and FFA.

External links
Colfax Junior-Senior High School Homepage

Educational institutions in the United States with year of establishment missing
High schools in Whitman County, Washington
Schools in Whitman County, Washington
Public middle schools in Washington (state)
Public high schools in Washington (state)